Jerzy Bulanow (Yury Bulanov, ; 29 April 1904, Moscow - 1980) was a Russian-Polish footballer who played as a defender.

Early life
As a teenager, started playing football in Nazdar Moscow, then moved to another local team - MKLS Moscow. However, some time in late 1918 or early 1919, he moved with family (parents and three brothers) from Russia to Poland, escaping the Russian Revolution (see: White Emigre).

Bulanow, a native speaker of Russian, came to Warsaw at the age of 16. He went to a Russian Gymnasium, but also started to learn Polish. Soon became proficient in the new language, later married a Polish woman from Warsaw, also wrote numerous articles, short stories, even novels. Nevertheless, he is the most famous for his soccer achievements.

Playing career
Together with older brother Borys, young Bulanow decided to continue football career after moving to Warsaw. The siblings briefly played for the teams of Korona Warszawa and Legia Warsaw and in 1923 they moved to Polonia Warsaw. In Polonia, Bulanow spent 12 years, representing the team in 163 games and scoring only one goal (he was a defender, which may explain the lack of scoring abilities).

Bulanow was first capped for the Poland national team in 1922, while still playing in Korona Warszawa. Then, after six years, he put on white-red jersey again, in 1928, becoming a regular starter. In late 1920s and early 1930s, the Russian emigre was highly appreciated as a player. His skills, manners and leadership abilities were noticed by coaches of the Poland national team — Bulanow altogether capped for Poland 22 times, in 17 games he was the captain. Together with Legia Warsaw's Henryk Martyna, the Russian player created a great pair of defenders.

 Debut in Poland national team: Cernauti, 3 September 1922, Romania - Poland 2-2.
 Last cap for Poland: Katowice, 18 August 1935, Poland - Yugoslavia 2-3.

Post-playing career and later life
Bulanow ended his playing career in 1935. Then, he became a coach in several Warsaw-area teams. During World War II he stayed in Warsaw, until early 1945, when the whole family decided to escape the advancing Red Army. In February 1945 the Bulanows (parents and four brothers) went on a risky train journey from Poland, via Bohemia and Austria to Italy. On the road, one of Bulanow's brothers, Roman, died when the train was bombed by Allied aircraft.

In mid-1945, after safely reaching Italy, Bulanow joined the Second Polish Corps under General Władysław Anders. Three years later, the whole family moved to Argentina. Bulanow died in 1980 in Buenos Aires.

Sources
 https://web.archive.org/web/20070928060224/http://www.reprezentacja.com.pl/index.php?plik=ludzie&nazwa=Postacie
 http://www.dumastolicy.pl/?strona/94.html
 http://www.legia.com.pl/pl/index.php?view=2&nID=13134 
 https://web.archive.org/web/20080210030047/http://www.kadra.pl/index.php?strona=historia&dzial=reprezentanci&litera=A-B

1904 births
1980 deaths
Polish footballers
Russian footballers
Footballers from Moscow
Footballers from Warsaw
Russian emigrants to Poland
Naturalized citizens of Poland
Association football defenders
Poland international footballers
Legia Warsaw players
Polonia Warsaw players
Polish emigrants to Argentina
Emigrants from the Russian Empire to Argentina
Polish football managers
Russian football managers
Polonia Warsaw managers
Polish military personnel of World War II